Županjac is a village in the municipality of Lazarevac, Serbia. According to the 2002 census, the village has a population of 582 people.

References

External links

Suburbs of Belgrade
Lazarevac